Terence O'Sullivan may refer to:

Terence M. O'Sullivan (born 1955), American labor leader
Terence O'Sullivan (politician) (1924–1997), Irish senator
Terence Patrick O'Sullivan (1913–1970), British civil engineer

See also 
Terry O'Sullivan (1915–2006), American actor